"If You Tolerate This Your Children Will Be Next" is a song by Welsh alternative rock band Manic Street Preachers. It was released on 24 August 1998, through Epic Records as the first single from their fifth studio album, This Is My Truth Tell Me Yours (1998). The track sold 156,000 copies in its first week and reached number one on the UK Singles Chart in August 1998. Outside the United Kingdom, the song reached number one in Iceland and the top 20 in Norway and Sweden. It became the band's only song to chart in North America, peaking at number 19 on the Canadian RPM Alternative 30 chart.

Background

The song's theme is inspired by the Spanish Civil War, and the idealism of Welsh volunteers who joined the left-wing International Brigades fighting for the Spanish Republic against Francisco Franco's military rebels. The song takes its name from a Republican propaganda poster of the time written in English and displaying a photograph of a child killed by the Nationalists, under a sky filled with bomber aircraft, with the song's titular warning written at the bottom.

Various real-life events from the Spanish Civil War provided inspiration for the lyrics. For example, the line "If I can shoot rabbits/then I can shoot fascists" is attributed to a remark made by a man to his brother who signed up with the Republican fighters. This was originally quoted in the book Miners Against Fascism by Hywel Francis. Another line, "I've walked Las Ramblas/but not with real intent", brings to mind the account in George Orwell's first-hand account of the war, Homage to Catalonia of fighting on the Ramblas. According to Orwell the various factions were seemingly getting nowhere with the fighting and often a sense of camaraderie overriding the vaunted principles each side was supposed to be fighting for. Nicky Wire has also acknowledged that he was also inspired by a song by the Clash, "Spanish Bombs", which features a similar subject.

The song was not originally intended for inclusion on This Is My Truth Tell Me Yours. It was recorded in a separate session from the rest of the album and was seen as a potential B-side; its original demo was described by bassist Nicky Wire as "crap."

Release
The song was released on 24 August 1998 as two CD singles: the first includes versions of "Prologue to History" and "Montana/Autumn/78", and the second features a remix by Massive Attack and a mix by David Holmes. Six days later, the single secured the number-one spot on the UK Singles Chart despite competition from "One for Sorrow" by Steps, which was released the same day. It has sold more than 600,000 copies in the UK and has been certified platinum by the British Phonographic Industry (BPI). It also became the group's biggest success on the Irish Singles Chart, reaching number three, and is the only Manic Street Preachers track to be released as a single in the United States and Canada. Although it did not make it onto any US Billboard chart, it became a moderate rock hit in Canada, peaking at number 19 on the RPM Alternative 30 chart for two weeks in August 1999.

The single was also a success in Sweden, where it reached number 21 and stayed in the chart for a total of 10 weeks. In Germany it reached number 79 and in the Netherlands, number 62; in both countries it remained on the charts for nine weeks. In Norway the song only charted for two weeks despite reaching number 19. It also reached number 49 in Australia and number 44 in New Zealand. "If You Tolerate This Your Children Will Be Next" was nominated in the category of Best British Single at the 1999 BRIT Awards. However, the award was won by Robbie Williams for "Angels".

In March 2009, it was discovered that the song was used on the website of the British National Party as the soundtrack of an article describing "the violence, hatred, fragmentation and despair" wrought on London by the "great multicultural experiment". The choice of this song was considered ironic by many, considering the song contains lyrics such as "So if I can shoot rabbits/Then I can shoot fascists". Record company Sony successfully had the song removed from the site on the grounds of unauthorised use. The BNP later released a press statement claiming that "the song had mistakenly been automatically streamed on to its site and had nothing to do with the official party", and that "you can interpret the lyrics any way you want".

Music video
The melody of the socialist anthem, "The Internationale" can be heard at the start and end of the video, played on a musical box. This was a popular song on the Republican side during the Spanish Civil War.

Wire praised the single's video, directed by W.I.Z. It features a typical nuclear family but with their eyes, mouths and ears sealed over with a flesh toned applicant. The family seem to exist in a futuristic show room, fashioned into a highly clinical 'home' of sorts. Nicky Wire described the video as "surreal, mildly disturbing ... with a suffocating feel to it despite its brightness." It was the fourth and final video directed by W.I.Z. for the band.

Legacy
The song is in the Guinness World Records as the number one single with the longest title without brackets. The song was voted number 20 on Channel 4's "100 Greatest Number One Singles" list. The song was performed at the Concert for Ukraine by the band on 29 March 2022.

Track listings
All music was written by James Dean Bradfield and Sean Moore except where indicated. All lyrics were written by Nick Jones except where indicated.

Credits and personnel
Credits are lifted from the This Is My Truth Tell Me Yours album booklet.

Studios
 Recorded at Rockfield Studios (Wales)
 Mixed at Air Studios (London, England)

Personnel

 James Dean Bradfield – music, vocals, acoustic guitar, 12-string guitar
 Sean Moore – music, drums
 Nicky Wire – lyrics (as Nick Jones), bass
 Nick Nasmyth – Wurlitzer, Hammond, Mellotron
 Andy Duncan – percussion
 Dave Eringa – production, engineering, mixing
 Lee Butler – production and engineering assistant
 Jon Bailey – mixing assistant

Charts and certifications

Weekly charts

Year-end charts

Certifications

Covers
The song was covered by David Usher on his 2003 album Hallucinations. DJ Eric Chase also recorded a cover of the song in December 2009. Radiohead frontman Thom Yorke occasionally sang portions of the song during live performances of "Everything in Its Right Place" during Radiohead's 2001 tour.

See also
 List of anti-war songs

References

1990s ballads
1998 singles
Anti-war songs
Epic Records singles
Manic Street Preachers songs
Number-one singles in Iceland
Rock ballads
Song recordings produced by Dave Eringa
Songs written by James Dean Bradfield
Songs written by Nicky Wire
Songs written by Sean Moore (musician)
UK Singles Chart number-one singles